Romanus of Samosata (died 297) was a martyr for Christianity in Syria in 297. He and his companions, Jacob, Philotheus, Hyperechius, Abibus, Julianus, and Paregorius were all subject to a variety of tortures before being hanged to trees and then nailed against them. They are mentioned in the Menaea Graeca and the Menologium der Orthodox-Katholischen Kirche des Morgenlandes. Their feast day is January 29.

Romanus is one of the 140 Colonnade saints which adorn St. Peter's Square.

References
Holweck, F. G. A Biographical Dictionary of the Saints. St. Louis, MO: B. Herder Book Co. 1924.

Year of birth missing
297 deaths
Syrian Christian saints
Groups of Christian martyrs of the Roman era
3rd-century Christian martyrs